The Citroën C4 Aircross is a sub-compact crossover Sports Utility Vehicle (SUV). It was unveiled at the 2012 Geneva Motor Show.

In October 2011, it was confirmed that the C4 Aircross would not be sold in the United Kingdom or Ireland, due to the Peugeot 3008 already being sold in those countries.

As of January 2017, the C4 Aircross was sold in Algeria, Argentina, Australia, Austria, Belgium, Burkina Faso, China, France, Germany, Lebanon, Luxembourg, Mongolia, Morocco, New Zealand, Norway, Portugal, Romania, Russia, Slovakia, South Africa, Spain, Switzerland, Tunisia, Ukraine, and Baltic countries. 

The related Peugeot 4008 was sold in the European countries listed above, but in fewer countries globally and not in right-hand drive format for the UK and Ireland.

Trim levels

The C4 Aircross was available in three trim levels: Attraction, Comfort and Exclusive. The Attraction models offered, among other features, seven-series airbags, manual air conditioning, MP3/CD radio and electric mirrors. The Comfort trim featured cruise control, automatic climate control, fog lights and alloy wheels, while the Exclusive trim provided rear-view camera assist, GPS, electric and heated front seats and 18-inch alloy wheels.  

Models sold from 1 June 2012 to 31 December 2013 were recalled in June 2017 owing to a suspected fault in the vehicles’ tailgate gas springs. Models sold from 1 June 2012 to 29 November 2013 were recalled in September 2017 owing to concerns that the windscreen wiper motors could fill with water and seize. The entry level was the C4 Aircross 1.6i in the Attraction finish. The diesel version started with the HDi 115 Attraction, while the high-end C4 Aircross was available with the HDi 150 Exclusive finish.

Successor
Production of the C4 Aircross ceased in April 2017 when it was replaced by the Citroën C5 Aircross, which was unveiled at the Shanghai 2017 China Fair, and then presented in Frankfurt, Germany, as well as the Geneva Motor Show of March 2018, before being officially marketed in November 2018.

Other uses the name 
In China, the name C4 Aircross was given to a long-wheelbase version of the C3 Aircross from December 2018 to December 2020.

Sales and production

References

C4 Aircross
Cars introduced in 2012
Mini sport utility vehicles
Crossover sport utility vehicles
Front-wheel-drive vehicles
All-wheel-drive vehicles
Vehicles with CVT transmission